Kachaleh Gerd (also Romanized as Kachleh Gerd and Kachleh Jerd; also known as Kachal Gerd and Kachliyird) is a village in Dashtabi-ye Gharbi Rural District, Dashtabi District, Buin Zahra County, Qazvin Province, Iran. At the 2006 census, its population was 852, in 184 families.

References 

Populated places in Buin Zahra County